John Bailey Farm is a historic home located in East Fallowfield Township, Chester County, Pennsylvania. It was built about 1810, and is a two-story, four bay, stone farmhouse with a gable roof in a vernacular Federal style. It features gable end chimneys. The property also contains a barn and spring house.

It was added to the National Register of Historic Places in 1985.

References

Houses on the National Register of Historic Places in Pennsylvania
Federal architecture in Pennsylvania
Houses completed in 1810
Houses in Chester County, Pennsylvania
National Register of Historic Places in Chester County, Pennsylvania